The 2011 Marburg Open was a professional tennis tournament played on hard courts. It was the second edition of the tournament which was part of the 2011 ATP Challenger Tour. It took place in Marburg, Germany between 20 and 26 June 2011.

ATP entrants

Seeds

 1 Rankings are as of June 13, 2011.

Other entrants
The following players received wildcards into the singles main draw:
  Constantin Christ
  Julian Lenz
  Oliver Marach
  Jan-Lennard Struff

The following player received entry as a special exempt into the singles main draw:
  Stefano Galvani

The following players received entry from the qualifying draw:
  Nikola Ćirić
  Marcin Gawron
  André Ghem 
  Artem Smirnov

The following player received entry into the singles main draw as a lucky loser:
  Simon Stadler

Champions

Singles

 Björn Phau def.  Jan Hájek, 6–4, 2–6, 6–3.

Doubles

 Martin Emmrich /  Björn Phau def  Federico Delbonis /  Horacio Zeballos, 7–6(7–3), 6–2

External links
Official website
ITF Search 
ATP official site

Marburg Open
Marburg Open
Marburg Open